Colpias is a monotypic genus of flowering plant in the family Scrophulariaceae. It has only one currently accepted species, Colpias mollis, native to South Africa. It secretes oils to attract specialised oil-collecting bees from the genus Rediviva. It is also known by the name klipblom, meaning stone plant in Afrikaans.

Description 
Colpias mollis is a many-branched shrublet, with brittle branches, growing up to 200 mm high. The leaves and branches of Colpias mollis are covered with soft hairs. During spring the small plants produce showy clusters of white or yellow flowers with a sweet or clove-like scent. It is confined to rock crevices, mostly in granite.

Distribution 
Colpias mollis is endemic to the Northern Cape. It is found from the Richtersveld to near Kamieskroon, Namaqualand and the Bokkeveld Mountains.

Conservation status 
Colpias mollis is classified as Least Concern as it is widespread and not in decline.

References

Scrophulariaceae
Scrophulariaceae genera
Monotypic Lamiales genera
Endemic flora of South Africa
Plants described in 1836